Block time may refer to:
Eternalism (philosophy of time), also called "block time philosophy"
Block time of blockchains, the average time taken to create each block